Karsten Hilse (born 12 December 1964) is a German politician for the populist  Alternative for Germany (AfD) and since 2017 member of the Bundestag.

Life and politics

Hilse was born 1964 in the East German town of Hoyerswerda and became a police officer 

Hilse joined the AfD in 2016 and became a member of the Bundestag after the 2017 German federal election.

Hilse denies the scientific consensus on climate change.

He polemicised against the resettlement of the wolf in the rural area of lusatia

References

1964 births
Members of the Bundestag for Saxony
Living people
Members of the Bundestag 2021–2025
Members of the Bundestag 2017–2021
Members of the Bundestag for the Alternative for Germany